Toeti Heraty (also known as Toeti Heraty Noerhadi-Roosseno; 27 November 1933 – 13 June 2021) was an Indonesian poet. She has been singled out as the "only woman amongst the leading contemporary Indonesian poets".

Biography
Toeti Heraty was born in Bandung, Java on 27 November 1933. Her father was a well-known engineering expert Roosseno Soerjohadikoesomo and her siblings all work in the hard sciences. Following her family tradition, she pursued medicine at the University of Indonesia (UI) from 1951 until 1955.  Then she took an advanced degree in psychology in 1962 and wrote her thesis on Simone de Beauvoir. At Leiden University, Netherlands she took her degree in Philosophy and produced a dissertation on "The I/Ego in Culture" or "Aku Dalam Budaya". While living in the Netherlands, she met her future husband, the Indonesian biologist Eddy Noerhadi. They married in 1958. Heraty completed her doctorate in philosophy at the University of Indonesia in 1979 with a thesis on "The Self and Culture".

Despite her studies in hard sciences, she found her inclination towards arts and literature. Besides being a poet, she was a philosopher, an art historian and a human rights activist.
She first began to write as a college student and since 1966 has been a frequent contributor to Indonesia's leading cultural and literary journals. She has since then occupied herself actively in the academic world. She taught in the Faculty of Psychology at Padjadjaran University. She co-founded (along with Soerjanto Poespowardojo) the Department of Philosophy of the Faculty of Arts at [UI] and served as a lecturer. She also remained the chairperson of both the Department of Philosophy and the post-graduate program for Philosophy Studies. Heraty also served as dean of the Lembaga Pendidikan Kesenian, Jakarta Institute of the Arts, and as acting professor at the Faculty of Arts at UI in 1994.

Toeti Heraty has been singled out as the "only woman amongst the leading contemporary Indonesian poets". Her poetry has been described as difficult to understand, combining a "deliberately cultivated ambiguity" with an "often unexpected, purely associative kind of imagery". But it is possibly her effective use of irony to highlight the unfavorable position of women in a patriarchal society that sets Toeti's poetry apart from that of her peers.  She released her first major collection of poems, "Sajak-Sajak 33" (Poems at 33) in 1974, including "Dua Wanita" (Two Women), "Siklus" (Cycle) and "Geneva Bulan Juli" (Geneva in July). She released her second volume of collected poems, "Mimpi dan Pretensi" (Dreams and Pretenses) in 1982. She has also edited a volume of Dutch and Indonesian poetry, and a collection of poetry by women. Her poem, "Calon Arang: the Story of A Woman Victimized by Patriarchy", a book-length lyric, provides critical insights into the standard perception of Indonesia's great archetypal figure, Calon Arang. The poem presents a three-dimensional picture of a woman who stands against the repressive, patriarchal society, but unfortunately is perceived as a legendary witch.

Heraty is considered to belong to the first generation of Indonesian feminist thinkers and has written extensively on issues of importance to women. Heraty's poetry reflects not just her feminist stance, but also her love for arts. Her house in Menteng, Jakarta, doubles as a gallery, housing a number of paintings by prominent painters, among them Affandi, S. Sudjojono, Srihadi Soedarsono. She also headed the Yayasan Mitra Budaya Indonesia, (YMBI, Foundation for Lovers of Indonesian Culture) in 1998. She was the founder of Jurnal Perempuan, a feminist magazine that raises issues concerning women. Heraty also offered her services to a non-government organization, Suara Ibu Peduli, that works for the empowerment of women.

Heraty died on 13 June 2021 at the Metropolitan Medical Center Hospital in Jakarta.

Publications

References

External links
 "Jogging in Jakarta"
 "Lontar Foundation"
 "Fragments of Autobiography"
 "Writers Unlimited"
  Biography of Heraty, Toeti | Southeast Asia Digital Library

1933 births
2021 deaths
20th-century Indonesian poets
20th-century Indonesian women writers
21st-century Indonesian poets
21st-century Indonesian women writers
Indonesian women poets
Indonesian writers
People from Bandung